Marble Palace is a Neoclassical palace in St. Petersburg, Russia, completed in 1785.

Marble Palace may also refer to:

Marble Palace (Kolkata), a 19th-century mansion in Kolkata, India
Marble Palace (Tehran), a 1937 royal residence in Iran
Marmorpalais, or "Marble Palace", an 18th-century royal residence in Potsdam, Germany
Ayuntamiento de Manila (Manila City Hall), in Intramuros, Manila, Philippines
280 Broadway, an 1846 building in New York City, US
United States Supreme Court Building, Washington D.C., US

See also
Marble House (disambiguation)